Mantribugh or Matri Bagh is a village panchayat located in Shopian district of Jammu and Kashmir.

Currently the village hosts more than five schools including a government high school. The Village is surrounded by lush green Apple orchards. A sub health centre (SHC) is also located in the village, which provides vaccination and medicines to the local populace.
Villages in Shopian district
Shopian district

Population Statistics
According to the 2011 census, Mantribugh has a total population of 1,141 peoples. There are about 181 houses in Mantribugh village. In 2011, the literacy rate of Mantribugh village was 71.63% . Thus Matri Bagh village has higher literacy rate compared to 62.49% of Shupiyan district. In Mantribugh, Male literacy stands at 81.66% while female literacy rate was 61.34%.

Economy 
The local economy depends on agriculture. Majority of the population are apple fruit growers.

See also
Shopian
Herman, Shopian
Kaprin

References 

Villages in Shopian district